Villa Hakasalmi, also known as Villa Karamzin, is an architecturally and historically important 19th-century villa located in the Etu-Töölö district of central Helsinki, Finland. The villa is situated in a prominent position on Mannerheimintie, next to Finlandia Hall and opposite the National Museum.

Designed by architect Ernst Lohrmann in the Empire style and built in 1844–1846, the villa was originally the summer residence of Senator and State Councillor . In 1896, Walleen's step-daughter Aurora Karamzin sold the villa to the City of Helsinki, although she was allowed to continue living there until her death six years later.

Since 1912, the villa has been occupied by the Helsinki City Museum, as one of its five main exhibition venues.

References

External links

Ernst Lohrmann buildings
Buildings and structures in Helsinki
Museums in Helsinki
Tourist attractions in Helsinki
Buildings and structures completed in 1846
Hakasalmi
Töölö